Luis Arturo Hernández Carreón (born 22 December 1968) is a Mexican former professional footballer who played as a striker and is the fourth all-time leading scorer of the Mexico national team with 35 goals, and the joint-highest goalscorer in World Cups. He is widely regarded as one of Mexico's most talented strikers.

Club career
In Mexico, Hernández played with a number of clubs, including Querétaro F.C., Cruz Azul, C.F. Monterrey, Club Necaxa, Club América, Tigres UANL, C.D. Veracruz, and Chiapas, and was twice named Mexico's Player of the Year in 1997 and 1998. He also played in Mérida Argentina, when he was signed by South American club Boca Juniors after his brilliant performance in the 1997 Copa América, but he failed to break into the starting line-up and spent the rest of his time on the bench. Returning to Mexico bitterly disappointed, he played with Necaxa and later on with Tigres UANL. It was with these two clubs, that he displayed his stupendous form, scoring 9 goals in 12 matches with Necaxa and 38 goals in 64 games with Tigres. He also became the only player to score goals in the Clásico Regiomontano with both teams from Monterrey.

After a few seasons with Tigres without qualifying to playoffs, Hernández ventured into the United States, in 2000 and signed with Major League Soccer club Los Angeles Galaxy. Hernández registered 15 goals in 40 games in the regular season and playoffs for the Galaxy. Hernández returned to Mexico in 2002 to play three more seasons with several clubs, including Club América, C.D. Veracruz, Chiapas F.C., and Lobos BUAP before retiring in 2005.

International career
Known for his long blonde hair, number 15 jersey and nickname of El Matador, Hernández had his first international cap against Uruguay on February 1, 1995. Hernández scored his first international goal on November 16, 1995, against Yugoslavia. Hernández gained notability during the 1997 Copa América, where he scored six goals and became the tournament's leading goal scorer. At the 1998 FIFA World Cup, he finished among the competition's top scorers with four goals, and became the first Mexican player to score more than two goals in World Cup history. The 35 goals he scored for Mexico makes him trail Cuauhtémoc Blanco (38 goals), Jared Borgetti (46 goals) and Javier Hernandez (52 goals) as the nation's fourth highest all-time leading goalscorer.

Hernández also played in the 2002 FIFA World Cup, albeit as a substitute in three games, and failed to score. He made his last international cap on June 17, 2002, against the United States.

Career statistics

Club

International

International goals

Honours
Monterrey
CONCACAF Cup Winners Cup: 1993

Necaxa
Mexican Primera División: 1994–95, 1995–96
Copa México: 1994–95
Campeón de Campeones: 1995
CONCACAF Cup Winners Cup: 1994

LA Galaxy
Lamar Hunt U.S. Open Cup: 2001

América
Mexican Primera División: Verano 2002

Mexico
FIFA Confederation Cup: 1999
CONCACAF Gold Cup: 1996, 1998

Individual
Copa América top scorer: 1997
CONCACAF Gold Cup Golden Boot: 1998
MLS All-Star: 2000, 2001

References

External links 
 International statistics at rsssf
 
 
 
Official Website - Luis Hernandez

1968 births
Living people
Footballers from Veracruz
Liga MX players
Argentine Primera División players
LA Galaxy players
Club América footballers
Club Necaxa footballers
Querétaro F.C. footballers
Cruz Azul footballers
Lobos BUAP footballers
C.F. Monterrey players
C.D. Veracruz footballers
Boca Juniors footballers
Mexican expatriate sportspeople in Argentina
Expatriate footballers in Argentina
Expatriate soccer players in the United States
1996 CONCACAF Gold Cup players
1997 Copa América players
1997 FIFA Confederations Cup players
1998 CONCACAF Gold Cup players
1998 FIFA World Cup players
1999 Copa América players
1999 FIFA Confederations Cup players
2000 CONCACAF Gold Cup players
2002 FIFA World Cup players
FIFA Confederations Cup-winning players
CONCACAF Gold Cup-winning players
Mexico international footballers
Tigres UANL footballers
Chiapas F.C. footballers
Mexican expatriate footballers
Mexican footballers
Mexican expatriate sportspeople in the United States
Major League Soccer players
Major League Soccer All-Stars
Association football forwards
Footballers at the 1995 Pan American Games
Pan American Games silver medalists for Mexico
Pan American Games medalists in football
Medalists at the 1995 Pan American Games